Mashpia or feminine Mashpi'oh lit. "person of influence", pl. Mashpi'im is the title of a Hasidic rabbi who serves as a spiritual mentor, whose main influence and teachings are in matters of the worship of God, the correction of virtues and spiritual elevation.

The source of the title is in the Lubavitcher Chassidus, in which the teachers of Chasidic teachings are referred to as Mashpi'im.

The general Hasidic public adopted this name around the year 2000 for rabbis who do not serve as congregational rabbis, and give shiurim in Hasidut and in the service of God. Some of the influencers began to lead communities, some as an alternative to Hasidic groups and some in parallel.

In addition, the title Mashpia is used for Mashgichim in Hasidic yeshivas, whose role is in the spiritual guidance of the young men, rather than supervision of their attendance during learning hours.

This title is nowadays commonly used in Breslov Hasidic movements, who have no rebbe. Previously, the subjects of this position were referred to as "community rabbis".

Mashpi'im in Chabad 

Chabad-Lubavitch mashpi'im refers specifically to one whose communal service as a spiritual mentor includes providing:
 communal guidance through regular public lectures and classes, and leading farbrengens, Hasidic gatherings;
 personal guidance in matters of decent interpersonal conduct and fine character traits;
 inspiration to strive ever higher in one's spiritual growth, through intensive Torah study and observance of mitzvos, particularly according to the Chabad hasidic tradition;
 answers to those seeking clarification on matters of hasidic philosophy, customs, and general conduct according to the Chabad-Lubavitch school of thought; and
 personally-tailored advice on how to advance in the uniquely Chabad discipline of avodas ha'tefilah, lit. "the service of prayer". This discipline involves lengthy meditation on sublime hasidic concepts before and during the course of prayer.

The nature of the role of mashpi'im is alluded to in the preface to the Tanya, the classic text of Hasidic philosophy written by Rabbi Shneur Zalman of Liadi, the first rebbe of Chabad-Lubavitch. It is discussed in numerous public talks delivered by Rabbi Yosef Yitzchok Schneersohn, the sixth Lubavitcher Rebbe, and Rabbi Menachem Mendel Schneerson, the seventh Lubavitcher Rebbe. In particular, he instructed that one should approach one's mashpia/mashpi'oh regularly to be examined and evaluated.

There is a distinction to be drawn between a rav and a mashpia/mashpi'oh. Although the two terms are similar and often used interchangeably, the former term usually refers to someone knowledgeable and scholarly, who holds some official communal position. The latter term, however, refers to an individual who is chosen simply as an objective outsider to offer advice and guidance, and is chosen based on his personal exemplary conduct. This person need not be otherwise qualified.

Mashpi'ois 
The seventh Lubavitcher Rebbe, Menachem Mendel Schneerson, also encouraged women and girls to assume a similar role of providing guidance, referring to such a woman as a mashpi'oh, pl. mashpi'ois.

Notable Chabad mashpi'im 

Past
 Hillel HaLevi of Paritch, d. (Paritch/Babruysk, Belarus, formerly part of the Russian Empire)
 Zalman Moishe HaYitzchaki, d. (Nevel, Russia; Tel Aviv, Israel)
 Menachem Mendel Futerfas, d. (Kfar Chabad, Israel)
 Yehuda Chitrik, d. (Crown Heights, NY)
 Rabbi Yossi Paltiel, (Crown Heights, NY)
 Rabbi Yosef Yitzchok "YY" Jacobson, (Monsey, NY)
 Menachem Zeev Greenglass d. (Montreal, Canada)
 Nissan Neminov, d. (Brunoy, France)
 Shlomo Chayim Kesselman, d. (Kfar Chabad, Israel)
 Yoel Kahn (Chozer and Senior Mashpia, Central Yeshiva Tomchei Temimim Lubavitch, Brooklyn, NY)
Present
 Sholom Charitonow (Senior Mashpia, Oholei Torah Talmudical Seminary, Brooklyn, NY)
 Shabsie Adler (Mashpia of Toronto, Ontario Canada)

References

External links 
 "Meet the new Admorim: the "Mashpi'im" on the Bechadrei Chareidim site.
 A public address of the Lubavitcher Rebbe about the importance of establishing mashpi'im

 
Chabad terminology
Orthodox rabbinic roles and titles
Jewish religious occupations
Chabad-Lubavitch (Hasidic dynasty)
Hebrew words and phrases